Fărău is a commune located in northeastern part of Alba County, Transylvania, Romania. It is composed of five villages: Fărău, Heria (Hari), Medveș (Nagymedvés), Sânbenedic (Magyarszentbenedek) and Șilea (Magyarsülye).

It lies at the divide between the Mureș River and Târnava Mică River valleys. The Fărău river, a left tributary of the Mureș, flows through the commune. 

Fărău borders to the east and northeast Bichiș commune, to the southeast Jidvei commune, to the south and southwest Șona commune, to the west Hopârta commune, and to the north and northwest Noșlac commune.

According to the census from 2011 there was a total population of 1,569 people living in this commune, of which 69.66% are ethnic Romanians, 22.18% are ethnic Hungarians, and 4.4% are ethnic Romani.

There are several wooden churches in the commune, including:
 The  in Fărău village, built in 1762.
 The Saint Nicholas Church in Sânbenedic village, built in the 18th century.
 The Holy Archangels Church in Sânbenedic village, built in 1775.
 The Saint Nicholas Church in Șilea village, built in the 18th century.

References

Communes in Alba County
Localities in Transylvania